TB or Tb may refer to:

Science and technology

Computing
 Terabyte (TB), a unit of information (often measuring storage capacity)
 Terabit (Tb), a unit of information (often measuring data transfer)
 Thunderbolt (interface)
 Test bench

Vehicles
 T.B. (Thompson Brothers), a three-wheeled cyclecar manufactured by Thompson Brothers of Bilston, England, from 1919 until 1924
 Torpedo boat, a relatively small and fast naval vessel designed to carry torpedoes into battle
 Boeing TB, an American torpedo bomber biplane designed by the US Navy and built by Boeing in 1927

Other uses in science and technology
 Terbium, symbol Tb, a chemical element
 Terrific broth, a bacterial growth medium for E. coli
 Tuberculosis (TB), a chronic infectious disease
 Tubercle bacillus, another name for Mycobacterium tuberculosis, the pathogen causing tuberculosis.
 Brightness temperature (Tb), in astrophysics

Sports
 TB Tvøroyri (Tvøroyrar Bóltfelag), a Faroese football club from Tvøroyri
 Tampa Bay Buccaneers, a professional American football team in the Tampa Bay Area
 Tampa Bay Lightning, a professional ice hockey team in the Tampa Bay Area
 Tampa Bay Rays, a professional baseball team in the Tampa Bay Area
 Total bases, a baseball statistic
 Tom Brady, professional football quarterback

Other uses
 Tablespoon (tb), a rough, culinary unit of volume
 Tommy Brown (record producer) (also known as TB or TB Hits), American record producer and songwriter
 Taco Bell, an American chain of fast-food restaurants
 Teboil (until 1966 TB), a Finnish gas station company 
 Tekkaman Blade, a Japanese animated TV series
Places in the United States
 TB, Maryland, an unincorporated community
 Tampa Bay, Florida